A nuclide (or nucleide, from nucleus, also known as nuclear species) is a class of atoms characterized by their number of protons, Z, their number of neutrons, N, and their nuclear energy state.

The word nuclide was coined by Truman P. Kohman in 1947. Kohman defined nuclide as a "species of atom characterized by the constitution of its nucleus" containing a certain number of neutrons and protons. The term thus originally focused on the nucleus.

Nuclides vs isotopes
A nuclide is a species of an atom with a specific number of protons and neutrons in the nucleus, for example carbon-13 with 6 protons and 7 neutrons. The nuclide concept (referring to individual nuclear species) emphasizes nuclear properties over chemical properties, while the isotope concept (grouping all atoms of each element) emphasizes chemical over nuclear. The neutron number has large effects on nuclear properties, but its effect on chemical reactions is negligible for most elements. Even in the case of the very lightest elements, where the ratio of neutron number to atomic number varies the most between isotopes, it usually has only a small effect, but it matters in some circumstances. For hydrogen, the lightest element, the isotope effect is large enough to affect biological systems strongly. In the case of helium, helium-4 obeys Bose–Einstein statistics, while helium-3 obeys Fermi-Dirac statistics. Since isotope is the older term, it is better known than nuclide, and is still occasionally used in contexts in which nuclide might be more appropriate, such as nuclear technology and nuclear medicine.

Types of nuclides

Although the words nuclide and isotope are often used interchangeably, being isotopes is actually only one relation between nuclides. The following table names some other relations.

A set of nuclides with equal proton number (atomic number), i.e., of the same chemical element but different neutron numbers, are called isotopes of the element. Particular nuclides are still often loosely called "isotopes", but the term "nuclide" is the correct one in general (i.e., when Z is not fixed). In similar manner, a set of nuclides with equal mass number A, but different atomic number, are called isobars (isobar = equal in weight), and isotones are nuclides of equal neutron number but different proton numbers. Likewise, nuclides with the same neutron excess (N − Z) are called isodiaphers. The name isotone was derived from the name isotope to emphasize that in the first group of nuclides it is the number of neutrons (n) that is constant, whereas in the second the number of protons (p).

See Isotope#Notation for an explanation of the notation used for different nuclide or isotope types.

Nuclear isomers are members of a set of nuclides with equal proton number and equal mass number (thus making them by definition the same isotope), but different states of excitation. An example is the two states of the single isotope  shown among the decay schemes. Each of these two states (technetium-99m and technetium-99) qualifies as a different nuclide, illustrating one way that nuclides may differ from isotopes (an isotope may consist of several different nuclides of different excitation states).

The longest-lived non-ground state nuclear isomer is the nuclide tantalum-180m, which has a half-life in excess of 1,000 trillion years. This nuclide occurs primordially, and has never been observed to decay to the ground state. (In contrast, the ground state nuclide tantalum-180 does not occur primordially, since it decays with a half life of only 8 hours to 180Hf (86%) or 180W (14%).)

There are 251 nuclides in nature that have never been observed to decay. They occur among the 80 different elements that have one or more stable isotopes. See stable nuclide and primordial nuclide. Unstable nuclides are radioactive and are called radionuclides. Their decay products ('daughter' products) are called radiogenic nuclides.

Origins of naturally occurring radionuclides
Natural radionuclides may be conveniently subdivided into three types. First, those whose half-lives t1/2 are at least 2% as long as the age of the Earth (for practical purposes, these are difficult to detect with half-lives less than 10% of the age of the Earth). These are remnants of nucleosynthesis that occurred in stars before the formation of the Solar System. For example, the isotope  (t1/2 = ) of uranium is still fairly abundant in nature, but the shorter-lived isotope  (t1/2 = ) is 138 times rarer. About 34 of these nuclides have been discovered (see List of nuclides and Primordial nuclide for details).

They occur in the decay chains of primordial isotopes of uranium or thorium. Some of these nuclides are very short-lived, such as isotopes of francium. There exist about 51 of these daughter nuclides that have half-lives too short to be primordial, and which exist in nature solely due to decay from longer lived radioactive primordial nuclides.

The third group consists of nuclides that are continuously being made in another fashion that is not simple spontaneous radioactive decay (i.e., only one atom involved with no incoming particle) but instead involves a natural nuclear reaction. These occur when atoms react with natural neutrons (from cosmic rays, spontaneous fission, or other sources), or are bombarded directly with cosmic rays. The latter, if non-primordial, are called cosmogenic nuclides. Other types of natural nuclear reactions produce nuclides that are said to be nucleogenic nuclides.

An example of nuclides made by nuclear reactions, are cosmogenic  (radiocarbon) that is made by cosmic ray bombardment of other elements, and nucleogenic  which is still being created by neutron bombardment of natural  as a result of natural fission in uranium ores. Cosmogenic nuclides may be either stable or radioactive. If they are stable, their existence must be deduced against a background of stable nuclides, since every known stable nuclide is present on Earth primordially.

Artificially produced nuclides
Beyond the naturally occurring nuclides, more than 3000 radionuclides of varying half-lives have been artificially produced and characterized.

The known nuclides are shown in Table of nuclides. A list of primordial nuclides is given sorted by element, at List of elements by stability of isotopes. List of nuclides is sorted by half-life, for the 905 nuclides with half-lives longer than one hour.

Summary table for numbers of each class of nuclides
This is a summary table for the 905 nuclides with half-lives longer than one hour, given in list of nuclides. Note that numbers are not exact, and may change slightly in the future, if some "stable" nuclides are observed to be radioactive with very long half-lives.

Nuclear properties and stability 

Atomic nuclei other than hydrogen  have protons and neutrons bound together by the residual strong force. Because protons are positively charged, they repel each other. Neutrons, which are electrically neutral, stabilize the nucleus in two ways. Their copresence pushes protons slightly apart, reducing the electrostatic repulsion between the protons, and they exert the attractive nuclear force on each other and on protons. For this reason, one or more neutrons are necessary for two or more protons to be bound into a nucleus. As the number of protons increases, so does the ratio of neutrons to protons necessary to ensure a stable nucleus (see graph). A number of lighter elements have stable nuclides with the ratio 1:1. The nuclide  (calcium-40) is observationally the heaviest stable nuclide with the same number of neutrons and protons (theoretically, the heaviest stable one is sulfur-32). All stable nuclides heavier than calcium-40 contain more neutrons than protons.

Even and odd nucleon numbers

The proton–neutron ratio is not the only factor affecting nuclear stability. It depends also on even or odd parity of its atomic number Z, neutron number N and, consequently, of their sum, the mass number A. Oddness of both Z and N tends to lower the nuclear binding energy, making odd nuclei, generally, less stable. This remarkable difference of nuclear binding energy between neighbouring nuclei, especially of odd-A isobars, has important consequences: unstable isotopes with a nonoptimal number of neutrons or protons decay by beta decay (including positron decay), electron capture or more exotic means, such as spontaneous fission and cluster decay.

The majority of stable nuclides are even-proton–even-neutron, where all numbers Z, N, and A are even. The odd-A stable nuclides are divided (roughly evenly) into odd-proton–even-neutron, and even-proton–odd-neutron nuclides. Odd-proton–odd-neutron nuclides (and nuclei) are the least common.

See also
Isotope (much more information on abundance of stable nuclides)
List of elements by stability of isotopes
List of nuclides (sorted by half-life)
Table of nuclides
Alpha nuclide
Monoisotopic element
Mononuclidic element
Primordial element
Radionuclide
Hypernucleus

References

External links

Livechart - Table of Nuclides at The International Atomic Energy Agency

 
Nuclear physics